The 2014 Yale Bulldogs football team represented Yale University in the 2014 NCAA Division I FCS football season. They were led by third year head coach Tony Reno and played their home games at the Yale Bowl. They were a member of the Ivy League. They finished the season 8–2 overall and 5–2 in Ivy League play to place third. Yale averaged 15,193 fans per game.

Schedule

References

Yale
Yale Bulldogs football seasons
Yale Bulldogs football